Sandra Mandir, born Popović, (born 4 August 1977 in Zagreb, SFR Yugoslavia) is a former Croatian basketball player. At the 2012 Summer Olympics, she competed for the Croatia women's national basketball team in the women's event. She is 5 ft 10 inches tall.

Career
  Medveščak (1997–01, 2003–04), Gospić (2007–09, 2010–11), Novi Zagreb (2004–05, 2011–2013), Šibenik (2005–07)
  Galatasaray (2001–02), Besiktas (2009–10), Istanbul Universitesi BGD (2013-) 
  Pécs (2002–03)

Awards
 in 2011, among 10 nominated candidates for the best European player, nominated by FIBA Europe
 8th player of Europe in 2012 among 10 nominated candidates for the best European player, nominated by FIBA Europe

References

External links
 The Three Seasons Of Sandra Mandir
Profile at eurobasket.com

1977 births
Living people
Basketball players at the 2012 Summer Olympics
Basketball players from Zagreb
Beşiktaş women's basketball players
Competitors at the 2005 Mediterranean Games
Croatian expatriate basketball people in Turkey
Croatian women's basketball players
Galatasaray S.K. (women's basketball) players
Guards (basketball)
Mediterranean Games medalists in basketball
Mediterranean Games silver medalists for Croatia
Olympic basketball players of Croatia
ŽKK Gospić players
ŽKK Novi Zagreb players
ŽKK Šibenik players